The 2015 Patriot League men's basketball tournament was a tournament played March 3, 5, 8 and 11 at campus sites of the higher seed. The winner of the tournament received an automatic bid to the NCAA tournament.

Seeds
Teams were seeded by conference record, with a ties broken by record between the tied teams followed by record against the regular-season champion, if necessary. If teams remain tied following these tiebreakers, RPI breaks the tie.

Schedule

Bracket

* Indicates overtime game.

References

External links
 2015 Patriot League Men's Basketball Championship

Patriot League men's basketball tournament
Tournament
Patriot League men's basketball tournament